Rajabhau Dattatraya Paranjpe (24 April 1910 – 9 February 1979), known as Raja Paranjape, was an Indian actor, director, producer and writer in the Marathi film and Hindi film industries.
He started to produce Marathi films under the banner named Gajraj with Madgulkar and Phadake. The super-hit Hindi film, Mera Saaya, was a remake of his Marathi film, Pathlaag.

Career
In a career spanning 40 years, Paranjape was associated with about 80 Marathi and Hindi films.

Films as director (29 titles)

Films as actor (20 titles)

References

External links
 
 https://web.archive.org/web/20130424005744/http://www.rajaparanjapepratishthan.org/index.html
 https://www.flickr.com/photos/rashid_ashraf/43991175431/in/dateposted/

Male actors in Marathi cinema
Marathi film directors
Male actors in Hindi cinema
1910 births
1979 deaths
20th-century Indian male actors
People from Sangli district
Marathi film producers
Marathi screenwriters
Film producers from Maharashtra
Film directors from Maharashtra
20th-century Indian film directors
20th-century Indian screenwriters